Semiha Mutlu (born March 5, 1987 in Koyulhisar, Sivas Province, Turkey) is a Turkish female racewalker.

She began racewalking at the age of 18, and is currently a member of the İzmir Büyükşehir Belediyespor. Mutlu is the holder of the national record in 20000m walk (track) with 1:44.38. She is qualified to represent Turkey in the 20km walk event at the⋅2012 Olympics in London.

In 2015 Mutlu was banned from sport for 30 months after abnormal deviations in her biological passport profile was found.

Personal bests
According to All Athletics Database, her personal bests are:
10 km walk: 49:43 - Izmir (TUR), 20.06.2010
20 km walk: 1:37:06 - Dudince (SVK), 26.03.2011

See also
 Turkish women in sports

References

1987 births
Living people
Turkish female racewalkers
People from Koyulhisar
Olympic athletes of Turkey
Athletes (track and field) at the 2012 Summer Olympics
Izmir Büyükşehir Belediyespor athletes
Doping cases in athletics
Turkish sportspeople in doping cases